Cutsdean is a rural village in the Cotswolds and smaller than average sized parish, a few miles east north-east of Cheltenham, Gloucestershire and the same distance south-southeast of Evesham. The River Windrush runs through the village.

It can get so windy in the village that the locals call it “two coats Cutsdean”.

History

The key estates of this  chapelry of Bredon parish, can be traced a generation or more further than typical, back to Anglo-Saxon England charters.  Its main estate and church were long possessions of the Worcester Priory, and was part of Worcestershire until 1931, when the detached part (exclave) status was resolved; it was moved to Gloucestershire.  Its population was 116, across 30 households in 1901; both figures stood in 1901, unchanged.

River

The west of the parish is marked by the Windrush. It has been briefly dammed, creating a tree-lined head of water, assisting the flow below in dry weather, also allowing for some algae which help to feed fish and de-nitrify the river in its rural, relatively headwater stage.

References

External links

Villages in Gloucestershire
Cotswold District